Harry Clayton may refer to:
Harry Clayton (Archie Comics), a character in Archie Comics
Harry Clayton (footballer) (1904–?), English footballer
Harry Clayton (politician) (1889–1946), member of the Queensland Legislative Assembly
Detective Inspector (DI), Harry Clayton, main character in Sky 1 drama Stan Lee's Lucky Man
Harry Clayton (Coronation Street), a character in the British soap opera Coronation Street

See also
Harold Clayton (disambiguation)
Henry Clayton (disambiguation)
Clayton (disambiguation)